Ihar Makaraw (born 26 February 1985) is a Belarusian professional footballer. As of 2021, he plays for Viktoryja Marjina Horka.

External links

1985 births
Living people
Belarusian footballers
Association football midfielders
FC Smena Minsk players
FC Minsk players
FC Vitebsk players
FC Slutsk players
FC Gorodeya players
FC Luch Minsk (2012) players
FC Neman Stolbtsy players
FC Molodechno players
FC Krumkachy Minsk players
FC Slonim-2017 players
FC Lida players
FC Dnepr Rogachev players
FC Viktoryja Marjina Horka players